Mayfair Recording Studios, earlier called Spot Studios or Ryemuse Studios, was a recording studio in London, England, located in Mayfair from the 1960s to 1981, then in Primrose Hill from 1981 until it closed in 2008.

In the early years the studio was owned by Ryemuse Ltd and was called Spot Studios. It was located at 64 South Molton St, Mayfair, above the chemist shop. John Hudson worked there as chief engineer, joining the company from BBC Television, where he was employed in presentation broadcasting live sound for programmes such as Jimi Hendrix Color Me Pop and Match of the Day. Through the early 1970s, Hudson was the engineer on many hit records to come out of the studios.

The studio was renamed from Spot to Mayfair in 1974. In 1977, John Hudson and his wife Kate took over the management of the studio. They bought the company in 1979. In 1980, they found a new site in Sharpleshall Street, Primrose Hill, to where they relocated the studio as the property in South Molton Street was to be sold. The new studios were designed primarily by Hudson, with input from other studio designers such as Eddie Veale and Ken Shearer acoustic consultant for the Royal Albert Hall.  Jim Crockett of Crockett Associates calculated and planned the sound isolation for studio one and reception. Initially the new complex consisted of just two studios, but this grew to six studios over the 30 years it was in business.

In the first week in its new location in April 1980 there were five records in the Music Week chart that had been recorded by Hudson at the old studios in Mayfair. That success carried over to the new studio complex at Primrose Hill and it was the beginning of a 30-year success story. The business eventually expanded to become a  complex housing Mayfair's Studio 1, Studio 2 and Studio 3, as well as three writing/production rooms. These rooms were occupied by writers, producers and artists such as Matt Rowe (Spice Girls), the writing/production team of Robbie Williams/Guy Chambers, and Herbert Grönemeyer, a successful German singer, actor and composer. A long list of hit records were recorded by an array of producers and artists over the years.

The studios closed in December 2008. A book by Kate Hudson titled What’s Mayfair Got to Do With It? was written about the reasons for the closure. These included insurance companies not paying legitimate claims, plus lawyers and accountants not meeting responsibilities, with the net result being chaos.

Notable artists and musicians such as Bucks Fizz, Gary Glitter, Tina Turner, Cliff Richard, The Clash, Pink Floyd, Bee Gees, Blur, Nigel Kennedy and Kroke, and The Smiths recorded music at Mayfair. A list of Mayfair's 30 years of hit records is available.

References

External links
 

Recording studios in London